Zvi Hirsh Broide (also spelled Tzvi Hirsch Braude) was a leading Talmudic scholar who served as Rav of the town of Salant.  He was the first rebbi of Rabbi Yisrael Salanter.

Life
His brother's name was Nachum Broide. Their father's name was Rabbi Arie Leib Broide, rabbi of Lvov and their mother was Chana, daughter of Rabbi Tzvi Hirsch Orenstein.

Namesake
He had a namesake, the son in law of the Rabbi Simcha Zissel Ziv, the Alter of Kelm, who was later the Rosh Yeshiva of the Kelm Yeshiva and the teacher of Rabbi Eliyahu Eliezer Dessler.

Famous students
 Rabbi Yisrael Salanter
 Rabbi Alexander Moshe Lapidos

References

19th-century births
Year of death missing
19th-century Lithuanian rabbis
Year of birth missing